The 5th Flying Training Squadron is part of the United States Air Force's Air Force Reserve Command serving as a reserve associate squadron operating with the 71st Flying Training Wing at Vance Air Force Base, Oklahoma.  It operates the Raytheon T-1 Jayhawk, Northrop T-38C Talon, and Beechcraft T-6A Texan II aircraft conducting flight training in support of the 71st Operations Group.

History

World War II

The squadron was established at Selfridge Field, Michigan as the 5th Pursuit Squadron an Army Air Corps fighter squadron in January 1941. It was assigned to the Northeast Air District with Curtiss P-40 Warhawks and Bell P-39 Airacobras as part of the defense buildup prior to the United States entry into World War II.

It deployed to the European Theater of Operations, assigned to VIII Fighter Command in August 1942.  Its Airacobras were deemed unsuitable for the environment for escort duty. It was re-equipped with Supermarine Spitfires and was trained by the Royal Air Force. It flew some escort missions with VIII Bomber Command Boeing B-17 Flying Fortresses and Consolidated B-24 Liberators during the fall of 1942.

It was sent to North Africa in late 1942 as part of the Operation Torch invasion forces, and took up station in Algeria.  It was reassigned to Twelfth Air Force and flew both fighter escort missions for the Flying Fortresses operating from Algeria and tactical interdiction strikes on enemy targets of opportunity in Algeria and Tunisia during the North African Campaign.

Following the German defeat and withdrawal from North Africa the squadron participated in the Allied invasion of Sicily and invasion of Italy and subsequent drive of the United States Fifth Army up the Italian Peninsula. Engaged primarily in tactical operations after November 1943, supporting ground forces and attacking enemy targets of opportunity such as railroads, road convoys, bridges, strafing enemy airfields and other targets.  It deployed to Corsica in 1944 to attack enemy targets in support of Free French forces in the liberation of the island and to support Allied Forces in the invasion of Southern France. It continued offensive operations until the German capitulation in May 1945. It returned to the United States and was inactivated during the fall of 1945.

Air Defense Command

It was reactivated in 1946 as a United States Air Forces in Europe (USAFE) fighter squadron. It was primarily an occupation unit at Schweinfurt Airfield and Bad Kissingen Airfield in Germany.  It was reassigned from USAFE to Air Defense Command (ADC) in June 1947, equipped with Northrop P-61 Black Widows, and stationed at Mitchel Field, New York, to perform air defense of the eastern United States.

In June 1948 the unit transitioned into North American F-82 Twin Mustangs. In the fall of 1949 the unit moved to McGuire Air Force Base, New Jersey. In August 1955 the 5th moved on paper to Suffolk County Air Force Base, New York. In the spring of 1957 the unit transitioned into Convair F-102 Delta Daggers.

In February 1960 the 5th moved to Minot Air Force Base, North Dakota, and transitioned into the Convair F-106 Delta Dart under the 32d Fighter Wing. Although the number of ADC interceptor squadrons remained almost constant in the early 1960s, attrition (and the fact that production lines closed in 1961) caused a gradual drop in the number of planes assigned to typical fighter squadrons, from 24 to typically 18 by 1964 and 12 by 1967.  These reductions resulted in the squadron's parent 32d Fighter Wing's inactivation and the transfer of Minot to Strategic Air Command in July 1962.

On 22 October 1962, before President John F. Kennedy told Americans that missiles were in place in Cuba, the squadron dispersed one third of its force, equipped with nuclear tipped missiles to Hector Field at the start of the Cuban Missile Crisis. These planes returned to Minot after the crisis.  In late 1962 the 5th acquired two live lynx kittens ("Spitten" and "Kitten") as mascots, with the assistance of the Minot Daily News, after a farmer had killed their mother.

In the mid-1980s the 5th converted to the McDonnell Douglas F-15 Eagles. The F-15s only flew over Minot until the spring of 1988, when the FIS was inactivated.  The lynx den in the squadron was one of the few places where Canada lynx had bred in captivity in the U.S., prompting both the St. Louis and San Diego Zoos to copy it in an attempt to get their own lynx inhabitants to produce offspring. Several generations of lynx flourished there, and after the unit was inactivated, Delta and Dart, twin kitten descendants of the original two Lynx kitten mascots were donated to the Roosevelt Park Zoo in Minot.

Pilot training
It was reactivated in 1990 as an Air Training Command (later Air Education and Training Command) undergraduate pilot Training squadron at Vance Air Force Base, Oklahoma, but was inactivated in December of the following year.   The squadron was activated again at Vance in 1997, but this time as a reserve unit.  As an associate unit, it trains pilots and pilot instructors alongside the active duty members of the 71st Flying Training Wing.

Lineage
 Constituted as the 5th Pursuit Squadron (Interceptor) on 20 November 1940
 Activated on 15 January 1941
 Redesignated 5th Fighter Squadron on 15 May 1942
 Inactivated on 7 November 1945
 Activated on 9 November 1946
 Redesignated 5th Fighter Squadron, All Weather on 10 May 1948
 Redesignated 5th Fighter-All Weather Squadron on 20 January 1950
 Redesignated 5th Fighter-Interceptor Squadron on 1 May 1951
 Inactivated on 1 July 1988
 Redesignated 5th Flying Training Squadron on 1 January 1990
 Activated on 16 February 1990
 Inactivated on 15 December 1991
 Redesignated 5th Flying Training Flight and activated in the reserve on 1 April 1997
 Redesignated 5th Flying Training Squadron on 1 April 1998

Assignments

 52d Fighter Group: 15 Jan 1941 – 7 Nov 1945
 52d Fighter Group (later 52d Fighter-All Weather Group, 52d Fighter-Interceptor Group): 9 November 1946
 4709th Defense Wing: 6 February 1952
 568th Air Defense Group: 16 Feb 1953
 4709th Defense Wing (later 4709th Air Defense Wing): 8 July 1954
 52d Fighter Group: 18 August 1955
 32d Fighter Group: 1 February 1960
 32d Fighter Wing: 1 February 1961

 Minot Air Defense Sector: 1 July 1962
 Great Falls Air Defense Sector: 25 June 1963
 28th Air Division: 1 April 1966
 24th Air Division: 19 November 1969
 25th Air Division: 1 June 1983
 Northwest Air Defense Sector: 1 December 1987 – 1 July 1988
 71st Flying Training Wing: 16 February 1990 – 15 December 1991
 610th Regional Support Group: 1 April 1997
 340th Flying Training Group: 1 April 1998 – present

Stations

 Selfridge Field, Michigan. 15 January 1941
 Floyd Bennett Airport, New York, 17 December 1941
 Selfridge Field, Michigan, 14 January 1942
 Florence Army Air Field, South Carolina, 18 February 1942
 Bluethenthal Field, North Carolina, 27 April 1942
 Grenier Field, New Hampshire, 12 June 1942 – 19 July 1942
 Northern Ireland, 19 August 1942
 RAF Goxhill, England, 26 August 1942 – 27 October 1942
 Tafaraoui Airfield, Algeria, 8 November 1942 (air echelon only) 
 La Senia Airfield, Algeria, 12 November 1942
 Orleansville Airfield, Algeria, 1 January 1943
 Telergma Airfield, Algeria, 19 January 1943
 Youks-les-Bains Airfield, Algeria, 8 March 1943
 Le Sers Airfield, Tunisia, 12 April 1943
 La Sebala Airfield, Tunisia, 20 May 1943
 Borizzo Airfield, Sicily, Italy, 1 August 1943
 Borgo Airfield, Corsica, France, 1 December 1943
 Madna Airfield, Italy, 14 May 1944
 Piagiolino Airfield, Italy, c. 24 April 1945
 Lesina Airfield, Italy, c. 10 July 1945 – August 1945
 Drew Field, Florida, 25 August 1945 – 7 November 1945
 Schweinfurt Airfield, Germany, 9 Nov 1946
 Bad Kissingen Airfield, Germany, 5 May 1947
 Mitchel Field (later Mitchel Air Force Base), New York, 25 Jun 1947
 McGuire Air Force Base, New Jersey, 4 October 1949
 Suffolk County Air Force Base, New York, 18 August 1955
 Minot Air Force Base, North Dakota, 1 February 1960 – 1 July 1988
 Vance Air Force Base, Oklahoma, 16 February 1990 – 15 December 1991
 Vance Air Force Base, Oklahoma, 1 April 1997 – present

Aircraft

 Curtiss P-40 Warhawk (1941–1942)
 Bell P-39 Airacobra (1942)
 Supermarine Spitfire (1942–1944)
 North American P-51 Mustang (1944–1945)
 Northrop P-61 Black Widow (1947–1948)
 North American F-82 Twin Mustang (1948–1951)
 Lockheed F-94A Starfire (1951–1953)
 North American F-86D Sabre (1953–1956)
 Convair F-102 Delta Dagger (1956–1960)
 Convair F-106 Delta Dart (1960–1985)
 McDonnell Douglas F-15 Eagle (1984–1988)
 Cessna T-37 Tweet (1990–1991, 1998–2006)
 Northrop T-38 Talon (1990–1991, 1998–Present)
 Raytheon T-1 Jayhawk (1998–Present)
 Beechcraft T-6A Texan II

See also

References

Notes
 Explanatory notes

 Citations

Bibliography

 
 
 
  
 
 McMullen, Richard F. (1964) "The Fighter Interceptor Force 1962-1964"  ADC Historical Study No. 27, Air Defense Command, Ent Air Force Base, CO (Confidential, declassified 22 Mar 2000)
 
 NORAD/CONAD Participation in the Cuban Missile Crisis, Historical Reference Paper No. 8, Directorate of Command History Continental Air Defense Command, Ent AFB, CO, 1 Feb 63 (Top Secret NOFORN declassified 9 March 1996)

External links

Military units and formations in Oklahoma
0005